Simon Jeppsson (born 15 July 1995) is a Swedish handball player for HC Erlangen and the Swedish national team.

He participated at the 2017 World Men's Handball Championship.

References

External links

1995 births
Living people
Sportspeople from Lund
Swedish male handball players
Expatriate handball players
Swedish expatriate sportspeople in Germany
Lugi HF players
SG Flensburg-Handewitt players
Handball-Bundesliga players
21st-century Swedish people